Rokia Traoré (born 24. January 1974) is a  Malian-born singer, songwriter and guitarist.

She made six albums between 1998 and 2016. Bowmboï (2003) won the Critics Award category at the BBC Radio 3 Awards for World Music in 2004 and Tchamantché (2008) won Victoires de la Musique World Music Album of the Year in 2009. Traoré won Best Artist in the Songlines Music Awards in 2009.

She is a member of the Bambara ethnic group.

Biography
Traoré's father was a diplomat and she travelled widely in her youth. She visited Algeria, Saudi Arabia, France and Belgium and was exposed to a wide variety of influences. Her hometown of Kolokani is in the northwestern part of Mali's Koulikoro region.

In 1997 Traoré linked with Mali musician Ali Farka Touré which raised her profile.

She was selected to be on the jury for the main competition section of the 2015 Cannes Film Festival.

Recordings
Her first album Mouneïssa (Label Bleu), released in late 1997 in Mali and September 1, 1998 in Europe, was acclaimed for its fresh treatment and unqualifiable combinations of several Malian music traditions such as her use of the ngoni and the balafon. It sold over 40,000 copies in Europe.

On July 11, 2000, her second album Wanita was released. Traoré wrote and arranged the entire album.

Her 2003 album Bowmboï has two tracks recorded with the Kronos Quartet but still sung in the Bamana language.

Her album Tchamantché was released on May 6, 2008, followed in 2013 by her album Beautiful Africa.

She wrote the music for the 2011 Toni Morrison play Desdemona.

Personal life 
From 2013 to 2018, Traoré had a relationship with Jan Goossens, a Belgian playwright and artistic director with whom she has a daughter, born in Belgium in 2015. Since their separation in 2018, the couple have been in conflict over custody of their daughter. The custody conflicts are due in part to conflict between African and European judicial systems. A court in Mali issued full custody to Traoré, but this was disputed by the government in Goossens' home country of Belgium. In March of 2020, Traoré was arrested after a judge in Brussels issued a warrant ordering her to surrender her 5-year-old daughter. Traoré was detained at Fleury-Mérogis prison near Paris and went on hunger strike upon her arrival. She had been traveling to Europe to attend a hearing related to the custody dispute at the time of the arrest. Several musicians publicly voiced support for Traoré and called for her release, including Angélique Kidjo, Damon Albarn, Youssou N'Dour, and Salif Keita.

Musical styles and influences 
Traoré's arrangements are minimal in nature and her vocal style is smooth and gentle. She uses traditional instruments such as the balafon, n'goni, and kora, as well as acoustic guitar and electric bass. She traveled to several continents as a child due to her father's work as a diplomat, and was exposed to musical styles including Western classical music, jazz, pop, and Indian traditional composition.

While the Bambara have a tradition of griot performing at weddings, members of the nobility, such as Traoré, are discouraged from performing as musicians. Traoré attended lycée in Mali while her father was stationed in Brussels and started performing publicly as a university student in Bamako. She plays acoustic guitar as well as sings, and uses vocal harmonies in her arrangements which are rare in Malian music. She also plays ngoni (lute) and balafon.

Performances

She played at WOMAD in 2004 and completed her first tour of North America in the same year.

In March 2005 she performed at the "Africa Live" festival, held in Dakar, Senegal.

Also in 2005 she performed at the Youssou N'dour and Friends concert in Geneva.

In December 2006 Peter Sellars' New Crowned Hope festival, which is part of the City of Vienna's celebrations commemorating Wolfgang Amadeus Mozart's birthday 250 years ago, saw the world premiere of Wati, a performance by Rokia Traoré and the Klangforum Wien.

In 2011 she performed at Paolo Fresu's Time in jazz festival in Berchidda.

In September 2012, she was included in the campaign "30 Songs / 30 Days" to support Half the Sky: Turning Oppression into Opportunity for Women Worldwide, a multi-platform media project inspired by Nicholas Kristof and Sheryl WuDunn’s book.

In 2013, she performed at Glastonbury Festival.

Awards
1997: Radio France Internationale prize, "African Discovery" of 1997.
2000: One of The New York Times''' critics nominated Wanita for album of the year.
2004: Winner, BBC Radio 3 Awards for World Music, Critics Award category for Bowmboï2004: Runner-up, BBC Radio 3 Awards for World Music, Africa category
2005: Runner-up, BBC Radio 3 Awards for World Music, Africa category
2009: Victoires de la Musique World Music Album of the Year for Tchamantché2009: Winner, Best Artist category, Songlines Music Awards" Songlines Music Awards 2009 Winner". Songlines (magazine). Accessed 22 October 2017

Discography

References

Further reading
 Rough Guides, World Music the Rough Guide: Volume 1 Africa Europe and the Middle East,'' Second Edition. London. 2000. Page 560

External links

African Musician Profile page on Traoré
Billboard Magazine profile of Traoré published July 15, 2000
Interview and acoustic concert at the Music Meeting 2009 festival

1974 births
Living people
Bambara-language singers
20th-century Malian women singers
21st-century Malian women singers
Traoré clan members
People from Koulikoro Region
Label Bleu artists